São Gabriel Futebol Clube, commonly known as São Gabriel, was a Brazilian football club based in São Gabriel, Rio Grande do Sul state. They competed in the Copa do Brasil once.

History
The club was founded in 2000 after two local clubs, named Sociedade Esportiva e Recreativa São Gabriel and Grêmio Esportivo Gabrielense, merged. São Gabriel won the Torneio Cidade de São Gabriel in 2004 and in 2006. The club competed in the Copa do Brasil in 2004, when they were eliminated in the Second Round by Palmeiras, after eliminating Figueirense in the First Round.

Achievements

 Torneio Cidade de São Gabriel:
 Winners (2): 2004, 2006

Stadium
São Gabriel Futebol Clube play their home games at Estádio Sílvio de Faria Correia. The stadium has a maximum capacity of 8,500 people.

References

Association football clubs established in 2000
Football clubs in Rio Grande do Sul
2000 establishments in Brazil